William Anthony Dunkle (born December 30, 1999) is an American football offensive guard for the Pittsburgh Steelers of the National Football League (NFL).

Early life and education
Dunkle was born on December 30, 1999, in San Ysidro, California, and grew up in Chula Vista. He attended Eastlake High School and was a three-time all-conference selection. 247Sports listed him as a three-star prospect.

Dunkle committed to San Diego State University in 2018, spending his first year as a redshirt. As a freshman in 2019, he played in all 13 games and started 12, making the Mountain West Conference team of the week three times and being named honorable mention all-conference at the end of the season. At the beginning of his sophomore season, Dunkle was selected preseason first-team All-Mountain West by College Football News. He started four games at right guard and appeared in five total, being named the team's best offensive player by College Football News.

As a junior in 2021, Dunkle started 14 games and played on 920 of San Diego State's 967 offensive snaps. Pro Football Focus listed him as having the second-highest overall grade and the number one run block grade in the nation. On 429 pass plays, he allowed only 10 quarterback pressures and allowed no sacks. At the end of the season, he was named first-team All-American by Pro Football Network, second-team by Associated Press and College Football Focus, and third-team by Pro Football Focus. He was also named first-team all-conference by the Mountain West coaches and media.

Professional career

Philadelphia Eagles 
After going unselected in the draft, he was signed by the Philadelphia Eagles as an undrafted free agent. He was released on August 14, 2022.

Pittsburgh Steelers 
The Pittsburgh Steelers signed Dunkle on August 16, 2022. He was waived on August 30 and signed to the practice squad the next day. He signed a reserve/future contract on January 10, 2023.

References

External links
 Pittsburgh Steelers bio
 San Diego State Aztecs bio

1999 births
Living people
Players of American football from California
American football offensive guards
San Diego State Aztecs football players
Sportspeople from Chula Vista, California
Philadelphia Eagles players
Pittsburgh Steelers players